Lettercraffroe Lough is a freshwater lake in the west of Ireland. It is located in the Connemara area of County Galway.

Geography

Natural history
Fish species in Lettercraffroe Lough include roach, brown trout and three-spined stickleback. Lettercraffroe Lough is part of the Connemara Bog Complex Special Area of Conservation.

See also
List of loughs in Ireland

References

Lettercraffroe